By the Way is a 2002 album by the Red Hot Chili Peppers.

By the Way may also refer to:

Buildings
By the Way (building), a 17th-century cottage in Lancashire, England

Film and TV
By the Way (TV series) (1979), children's show that aired on the Nickelodeon channel in 1979 as one of the network's inaugural programs.

Music
"By the Way" (Red Hot Chili Peppers song) (2002)
"By the Way" (Theory of a Deadman song) (2009)
"By the Way" (Lindsay Ell song) (2015)
"By the Way", a 1969 song by The Tremeloes A. Blakley, L. Hawkes
"By the Way", a song by Barbra Streisand from Lazy Afternoon (1975), B-side to "My Father's Song"
"By the Way", a song by No Doubt from The Beacon Street Collection (1995)
"By the Way", a song by The Big Three 1963
"By the Way", a 1962 song by Matt Monro 1962
"By the Way", a 1982 song by Modern Romance (band)
"By the Way", a 2019 song by Teenage Joans

See also
BTW (disambiguation)